Devia is a genus of plants in the family Iridaceae first described in 1990. It contains only one known species, Devia xeromorpha, endemic to the southwestern part of Cape Province in South Africa. The genus was named in honour of the South African botanist and academic, Miriam Phoebe de Vos.

References

Iridaceae
Endemic flora of South Africa
Taxa named by Peter Goldblatt
Taxa named by John Charles Manning